Alzheimer’s Disease International (ADI) is a not-for-profit, international federation of Alzheimer and dementia associations from around the world. The organization is in official relations with the World Health Organization (WHO). ADI advocates for people living with Alzheimer’s disease and all other types of dementia.

The organisation works to establish dementia as a global, regional and local priority through empowering Alzheimer and dementia associations to advocate for dementia as a national priority, to raise awareness and to offer care and support for people with dementia and their care partners; as well as campaigning for better policy from governments and encourage investment and innovation in dementia research.

The organisation is headquartered in London, UK with an Asia Pacific regional office located in Jakarta, Indonesia.

The current Chief Executive Officer is Paola Barbarino.


History 
The organisation was formed in 1984, when a group of carers and experts came together to discuss the formation of an international organisation to advocate for Alzheimer’s disease. Representatives from existing Alzheimer associations in the USA (Alzheimer’s Association), UK (Alzheimer’s Society), Australia (Dementia Australia) and Canada (Alzheimer’s Society of Canada) founded ADI. Observers from Belgium (Ligue Nationale Alzheimer Liga) France (France Alzheimer) and Germany (Deutsche Alzheimer Gesellschaft) were also present.

In the early years, the primary role of the organisation was to build international connections between existing associations and other partners, coordinating international activities and sharing information.

Starting in the 1990s, ADI actively sought to expand its membership, focusing on developing and engaging new associations, particularly in low-and middle-income countries. Since its establishment, the organisation’s membership has increased from 4 to over 100 full members .

More recently, the organisation has expanded its focus to public policy and global awareness raising, through publications, campaigns and policy recommendations. To date, it continues to advocate for better policy at international and regional levels, while supporting and developing the capacity of Alzheimer and dementia associations around the world.

Member Associations 
In its capacity as a federation, ADI supports existing entities, in addition to new Alzheimer and dementia associations, to develop and strengthen, providing its members with access to information, knowledge and support to further enable them to deliver on their objectives. ADI also provides training courses, known as Alzheimer University and a twinning programme between member associations.

New and emerging associations are invited to join the Membership Development Programme (MDP). The programme lasts for two years, with associations who meet the required criteria being invited to join as an official ADI member.

ADI currently has 105 full members with each member representing their respective country.

World Alzheimer’s Month 
Each year ADI and its members organise the global awareness raising campaign World Alzheimer’s Month. The campaign aims to challenge the stigma and discrimination which still exists around the condition.

Started in 2011, World Alzheimer’s Month takes place every September and has a different key message or theme each year, which can be used to raise awareness, educate or challenge the public’s misconceptions about dementia.

World Alzheimer’s Day is on 21 September and was launched in 1994 to coincide with the 10th anniversary of the existence of the organisation. In more recent years, World Alzheimer’s Day has become the focal point of the World Alzheimer’s Month campaign and has often been the day in which ADI launches its World Alzheimer Report (See Publications). World Alzheimer’s Day is officially recognised by the WHO.

Policy 
The organisation works to ensure that dementia is considered a global health probity through working with multilateral and regional bodies as well as national advocacy in collaboration with member associations. ADI has official status as a non-state actor with the World Health Organization (WHO).

WHO Global Action Plan on the public health response to dementia 
Together with other strategic partners, ADI collaborated with the WHO to develop the report 'Dementia: a public health priority'. This report was followed by the publication of the ‘World report on ageing and health’  and the 'Strategy and Plan of Action of Dementias in Older Persons for the period of 2015-2019'.

Following this, The WHO commenced the development of a Global Action Plan for dementia'. In 2017, the Global Action Plan on the public health response to dementia was unanimously adopted by all WHO Member States at the WHO 70th World Health Assembly by all WHO Member States.

Since the adoption of the Global Action Plan, the organisation has actively advocated to all WHO Member States to develop, fund and adopt National Dementia Plans, which cover all seven strategic areas.

United Nations (UN) 
ADI advocates to the United Nations (UN) with a particular focus on the rights of older persons and disability, following the adoption of the UN Convention for the Rights of People with Disabilities (CRPD). The document specifically lists dementia as a disability.

Through the UN Open-ended Working Group on ageing, ADI has campaigned for equal rights for those living with dementia and carers in the labour market.

Other Multilateral bodies 
The organisation seeks to establish dementia as a global priority within the G20 and its respective workstreams.

In 2019, Dementia was specifically recognised as a global health priority by G20 leaders in the declaration of the Osaka Summit following advocacy by ADI and member association Alzheimer’s Association Japan (AAJ).

In 2022, as part of the Values20 workstream of the Indonesian presidency of the G20, dementia was included in the Communiqué which was sent to G20 leaders, urging Member States to committee to implementing a national dementia plan and prioritising dementia in their countries.

Research

COGNISANCE 
ADI is an external collaborator in the joint European Union (EU) funded programme for Neurodegenerative Disease Research (JPND). The project’s focus is to co-design dementia diagnosis and post diagnostic care; develop a tool-kit to be disseminated internationally and develop a set of standards to guide the diagnostic and post-diagnostic process.

CST International 
ADI sits on the Advisory Board of the University College London project focusing on work in Brazil, India, and Tanzania. The project aims to develop, test, refine and disseminate implementation strategies for people living with dementia.

DISTINCT 
ADI is an external collaborator in conjunction with nine other academic partners. The project aims to develop a multi-disciplinary, multi-professional education and training research framework for Europe aimed at improving technology and care for people with dementia and their carers. ADI offers expertise in areas of community-based practice and national policies through participating in training and education of the early stage researchers.

INDUCT 
Interdisciplinary network for dementia using current technology (INDUCT) is a partnership across University of Nottingham, University College London, Maastricht University, University of Amsterdam, Karolinska Institutet, Vrije Universiteit Brussel, Charles University, and IDES, Spain, which aims to develop a multi-disciplinary, inter-sectorial educational research framework for Europe to improve technology and care for people with dementia, and to provide the evidence to show how technology can improve the lives of people with dementia. ADI sits on the project’s supervisory board an provides training a yearly summer school focusing on turning research into policy.

STRIDE 
Until the cessation of funding, ADI managed the STRiDE project (Strengthening responses to dementia in developing countries) in partnership with the London School of Economics and Political Science (LSE). The project aimed to build research capacity, develop research evidence into what interventions work most effectively, and to better understand the impact and cost of dementia.

10/66 Dementia Research Group 
ADI previously convened the now defunct 10/66 Dementia Research Group. The group aimed to develop data on the number of people living with dementia around the world, particularly in low-and-middle-income countries.

Publications 
ADI publishes reports and position papers on a number of topics relating to dementia.

World Alzheimer Report 
The World Alzheimer Reports are a comprehensive source of global socioeconomic information on dementia which are published each year on a different topic.

From Plan to Impact 
Following the adoption of the Global Action Plan on the Public Health Response to Dementia (See Policy), ADI has tracked the progress of WHO Member States towards achieving the targets of the seven action areas of the Global Action Plan through its report series: From Plan to Impact.

These reports have been typically launched as side events at the WHO’s World Health Assembly in Geneva, both in-person and virtually.

Accreditation 
In 2021, ADI launched an accreditation programme aiming to support the improvement of care for people with dementia and reduce the variation in the quality of care provided. Successful completion of an evaluation of carers, care trainers and providers of training programmes can result in ADI accreditation, meaning that the training and learning activities have reached the required integrity and quality at all levels.

Conferences 
ADI hosts the longest running international conference on dementia. These biennial events often occur in collaboration with ADI member associations. The conferences seek to bring together researchers, scientists, clinicians, allied healthcare professionals, people living with dementia, family members, care professionals, and staff and volunteers of Alzheimer associations.

Since the adoption of the WHO Global Action Plan on the Public Health Response to Dementia (See Policy), the theme of the conference has centred around the seven action areas of the Global Action Plan.

References

External links
Alzheimer's Disease International (ADI)

Alzheimer's and dementia organizations
Organizations established in 1984
Health charities in the United Kingdom